= Aghze Poya =

- Location within Pakistan
- Coordinates: 33.16°N 70.53°E
- Country: Pakistan
- Territory: Federally Administered Tribal Areas
- Elevation: 580 m (1,900 ft)
- Time zone: UTC+5 (PST)
  - Summer (DST): UTC+6 (PDT)

Aghze Poya is a town in the Khyber Pakhtunkhwa province of Pakistan. It is located at 33°9'18N 70°31'33E with an altitude of 580 metres (1906 feet).
